Indira Gandhi Engineering College, Sagar is an institute of engineering and technology education located at Sagar  city of Madhya Pradesh, India. Established in 1981, it is a government owned technical institute affiliated to "Rajiv Gandhi Prodyogiki Vishvidyalaya" university.

History 
IGEC Sagar was established by government of Madhya Pradesh in November 1981. It is one of the government autonomous engineering colleges of Madhya Pradesh India. Initially it was named as "Government Engineering College Sagar" and it was affiliated to Sagar University. The name was subsequently modified to "Indira Gandhi Engineering College Sagar" and since 2000 it is affiliated to Rajiv Gandhi Proudyogiki Vishwavidyalaya, Bhopal, Madhya Pradesh. The institute initially became functional from its old site close to "Dr. Hari Singh Gour University Sagar". It was shifted to the newly constructed campus in December 1986. Its campus is housed inside the 220 acres land allotted by the government in 1985, on a hillock about 10 km from Sagar City. near Baheriya Village. Institute is recognized by All India Council for Technical Education (AICTE) and follows its mandate for all the courses.

Courses
The Institute offers B.E/B.Tech degree courses , for following branches :
 Information Technology,
 Civil engineering
 Mechanical engineering
 Electronics and Communication engineering
 Electrical Engineering.

See also
Dr. Hari Singh Gour University
Lakshmi Narain College of Technology
University Institute of Technology RGPV

External links
 Official website

Universities and colleges in Madhya Pradesh
Engineering colleges in Madhya Pradesh
Education in Sagar, Madhya Pradesh